Ladny is a Krivak-class missile frigate of the Russian Navy. She also served with its predecessor service, the Soviet Navy.

Ladny was ordered by the Soviet Union in 1978 and was laid down in May 1979. The ship was commissioned in the Soviet Black Sea Fleet in 1981. After the collapse of the Soviet Union in December 1991 the frigate became a part of the Russian Navy. As of 2021 the frigate was active with the Russian Black Sea Fleet.

In July 2015 Ladny took part in Navy Day celebrations in Sevastopol.  While Ladny was demonstrating her firepower, one of her SS-N-14 missiles misfired, damaging its launcher, and spiralled out of control before landing harmlessly in the sea.

References

External links 
 

Krivak-class frigates of the Russian Navy
Ships built in the Soviet Union
Naval ships of Russia
1980 ships
Maritime incidents in 1986
Ships built at the Zalyv Shipbuilding yard
Cold War frigates of the Soviet Union